One Night with You: The Best of Love, Volume 2 (issued without the 'Volume 2' title internationally) is the third compilation album released by American singer Luther Vandross, released on September 15, 1997 by Epic Records. It is his second compilation album to be released stateside, and is a continuation of his triple-platinum selling first compilation The Best of Luther Vandross... The Best of Love (1989). One Night with You contains four newly recorded songs including the R. Kelly-penned and Grammy-nominated "When You Call on Me/Baby That's When I Come Runnin'" and selections compiled from his later studio albums such as Songs (1994), This Is Christmas (1995), Never Let Me Go (1993), Power of Love (1991) and Your Secret Love (1996).

The album also contains his then-biggest pop hits such as "Power of Love/Love Power", an alternate club mix of "The Best Things in Life Are Free" (a duet with Janet Jackson from the Mo' Money soundtrack) and a cover of the Lionel Richie/Diana Ross recording "Endless Love" with Mariah Carey, which became his biggest hit on the Billboard Hot 100 peaking at number two. The album was moderately successful, reaching the top 50 of the Billboard 200 album chart and peaking inside the top 20 within the R&B Albums chart. One Night with You was certified platinum by the Recording Industry Association of America (RIAA) in 2021.

Track listing

International edition
"When You Call on Me/Baby That's When I Come Runnin'" – 4:42
"One Night with You (Everyday of Your Life)" – 4:25
"I Won't Let You Do That to Me" – 4:34
"It's All About You" – 5:29
"The Rush"
"I Gave It Up (When I Fell in Love)"
"Don't Want to Be a Fool" – 4:36
"The Best Things in Life Are Free" (Classic Club Edit with Janet Jackson) – 4:03
"Little Miracles (Happen Every Day)" – 4:43
"Endless Love" (with Mariah Carey) – 4:20
"Always and Forever" – 4:54
"Hello"
"Your Secret Love" – 4:12
"I Can Make It Better" – 5:36
"Love Don't Love You Anymore" (TM's Urban Mix) – 4:09
"Heaven Knows"

Charts

Certifications

References

1997 greatest hits albums
Albums produced by Luther Vandross
Albums produced by Walter Afanasieff
Epic Records compilation albums
Luther Vandross compilation albums